The 2022–23 season is the 70th in the history of Dynamo Dresden and their first season back in the third division since 2021. The club are participating in 3. Liga and DFB-Pokal.

Players

Out on loan

Transfers

Pre-season and friendlies

Competitions

Overall record

3. Liga

League table

Results summary

Results by round

Matches 
The league fixtures were announced on 24 June 2022.

DFB-Pokal

Reg. Cup Sachsen

References 

Dynamo Dresden seasons
Dynamo Dresden